Paulo de Mello Gomes (born April 14, 1948 in Ribeirão Preto) is a retired Brazilian racing driver. He won the Stock Car Brasil in 1979, 1983, 1984 and 1995.

Gomes competed in Stock Car Brasil from 1979 to 2003. In 2007, he returned briefly to compete in the last six races before retiring.

Gomes is father of Marcos Gomes and Pedro Gomes, both of whom are also racing drivers.

References

External links

1948 births
Living people
People from Ribeirão Preto
Brazilian racing drivers
Stock Car Brasil drivers
24 Hours of Le Mans drivers
Sportspeople from São Paulo (state)